Black Friday, Mad Friday, Frantic Friday or Black Eye Friday is a nickname for the Friday before Christmas Eve (24 December)—that is, the Friday after 16 December—in Great Britain.

It is the most popular night for end-of-year corporate and industrial Christmas parties, which consequently makes it one of the busiest nights in the year for ambulances and the police.

Names
The term Black Friday originates as "jargon" used by NHS and Police, and has entered the popular lexicon. From 2013, the press began to use the term Mad Friday to avoid confusion with the American Black Friday in November, which was growing increasingly popular in the UK due to marketing by American retailers.

In parts of the United Kingdom, the day has been referred to as Black Eye Friday, due to unusually high number of fights that break out in bars, pubs and clubs in the area.

It is sometimes called Builders' Friday, as it is the last day of work for many construction workers.

In some towns, mostly in Devon, United Kingdom, it is also known as Factory Friday, as it is the last day of work for many factory workers who finish work at lunchtime and spend the rest of the day socialising in pubs.

In the North of England, the term "Mad Friday" has been around since at least the early nineties.

Safety concerns and preventive measures

In anticipation of the festivities, police and emergency services officials begin their preparations for Black Friday early in December.  Ambulance Trusts around the country plan and set up mobile "drunk tanks" in city centres to help lighten the load on hospitals and police cells. Some of the higher end mobile units can treat up to 11 people at a time with eight beds, seats with restraint straps and two showers, and can cost up to £500,000. In Manchester, temporary metal detectors, or "knife arches", are erected in the busiest parts of the city to assure the public that no weapons of any kind will be tolerated.

Social media

In December 2013, Greater Manchester Police promoted the hashtag #MadMancFriday to expose some of the embarrassing things that revellers would do, in the hopes of discouraging them from getting so publicly drunk again next year.

Christian Nightlife Initiatives launched a "StaySafe" campaign to encourage responsible behaviour via social media.

In December 2018, The Scarborough Police Service tweeted every 999 call they received to raise awareness. It is believed that Black Eye Friday puts a tremendous strain on local resources through anti-social behaviour.

Table of dates
Black Friday takes place every year on the Friday before 24 December (Christmas Eve).

References

External links

Christmas in the United Kingdom
Christmas-linked holidays
December observances
Friday
Social events
Unofficial observances